Rayman Brain Games, also known as Rayman Junior, is an educational video game published and developed by Ubisoft. It is an entry in the Rayman series and stars the titular character.

It was originally published as "Amazing Learning Games with Rayman" in 1996, and "Rayman Learning Center" in 1999.

Gameplay and premise
Rayman Brain Games is based in the Rayman series and stars protagonist Rayman. Other characters featured in the game from the series include Betilla the Fairy, the unnamed Magician, and the villain Mr. Dark. The story involves Rayman retrieving the Magic Book of Knowledge, which has been stolen by Mr. Dark.

The game features exercises in phonics and mathematics with three difficulty modes for each. Each exercise is presented as a fork in the road. A phonics or math question will be posed, and the player must travel along the path marked with the correct answer. Travelling along an incorrect path will lead to Rayman's death.

Non-educational platforming challenges, including bottomless pits, enemies, and spikes, fill the gaps between educational questions.

Reception
Rayman Brain Games has received mixed reception since its release. Writer Bonnie James felt that the game mixed educational elements with gameplay well and that kids who enjoy playing games will enjoy this, though they noted that it requires game playing experience to maximize enjoyment. They went on to praise the game's aesthetic and conceptual variety and the quality of the game's visuals. They felt that the game should have more choice to what players can do from the beginning, comparing the idea to how one can do questions out of order on a test. Writer Jennifer Beam felt that the experience may captivate players, but noted that its learning elements developed too slowly. They also criticized sound issues, which may hamper a child's ability to hear instructions or questions clearly. Active Learning Associates praised it for its addictive, action-oriented gameplay. Writer George Kalmpourtzis noted that the educational approach of "modifying and extending their game mechanisms" that Rayman Brain Games takes is a risky one, arguing that such games can result in no educational impact on players. They went on to argue that such a game does not lend itself to being used in classrooms due to being unhelpful as educational games. Writer Andrzej Sitek felt that it was an interesting approach to platform games, commenting on their issues with children's educational video games being unrefined.

References

2000 video games
Children's educational video games
Windows games
PlayStation (console) games
Rayman
Video games developed in France